Homosclerophorida is an order of marine sponges. It is the only order in the monotypic class Homoscleromorpha. The order is composed of two families: Plakinidae and Oscarellidae.

Taxonomy
Homoscleromorpha is phylogenetically well separated from Demospongiae. Therefore, it has been recognized as the fourth class of sponges.

It has been suggested that Homoscleromorpha are more closely related to eumetazoans than to the other sponge groups, rendering sponges paraphyletic. This view has not been supported by later work using larger datasets and new techniques for phylogenetic inference, which tend to support sponges as monophyletic, with Homoscleromorpha grouping together with Calcarea.

On the basis of molecular and morphological evidence, the two families Plakinidae and Oscarellidae have been reinstated.

There are 117 species in this group divided into 9 genera.

The spiculate genera in this group are Aspiculophora, Corticium, Placinolopha, Plakina, Plakinasterella, Plakortis and Tetralophophora.

The aspiculate species are the genera Oscarella and Pseudocorticium.

Description
These sponges are massive or encrusting in form and have a very simple structure with very little variation in spicule form (all spicules tend to be very small). Reproduction is viviparous and the larva is an oval form known as an amphiblastula. This form is usual in calcareous sponges but is less common in other sponges.

Habitat
Homoscleromorpha are exclusively marine sponges that tend to encrust on other surfaces at shallow depths. These sponges typically inhabit shady locations, under overhangs and inside caves. In the Mediterranean Sea, 82% of the species in this taxon can be found in caves, and 41% of them are found nowhere else.

References

External links

 What are sponges? Queensland Museum
 Sponge guide

 
Taxa named by Arthur Dendy